John Gragg is a former American football coach.  He was the head football coach at McPherson College in McPherson, Kansas, serving for one season, in 1978, and compiling a record of 5–4.

Head coaching record

References

Year of birth missing (living people)
Living people
McPherson Bulldogs football coaches